Novinsky is a rural locality (a settlement) in Karaulinsky Selsoviet, Kamyzyaksky District, Astrakhan Oblast, Russia. The population was 245 as of 2010. There is 1 street.

Geography 
Novinsky is located 34 km south of Kamyzyak (the district's administrative centre) by road. Karaulnoye is the nearest rural locality.

References 

Rural localities in Kamyzyaksky District